Rock Valley Community School District is a rural public school district headquartered in Rock Valley, Iowa. The district is mostly within Sioux County, with a small area in Lyon County, and serves the town of Rock Valley and the surrounding rural areas.

Schools
The district operates three schools in a single building at 1712 20th Ave in Rock Valley:
 Rock Valley High School
 Rock Valley Middle School
 Rock Valley Elementary School

Rock Valley High School

Athletics
The Rockets are members of the Siouxland Conference, and participate in the following sports:
Football
 2016 Class 2A State Champions (as Boyden–Hull-Rock Valley)
Cross Country
Volleyball
Basketball
Boys' 4-time Class 1A State Champions (1996, 1998, 2009, 2010)
Girls' 3-time State Champions (2001, 2002, 2003) 
Wrestling
Golf
 Boys' 4-time Class 1A State Champions (1979, 1988, 1992, 1993)
Track and Field
Baseball
 1951 State Champions 
Softball

Enrollment

See also
List of school districts in Iowa
List of high schools in Iowa

References

External links
 Rock Valley Community School District

School districts in Iowa
Education in Lyon County, Iowa
Education in Sioux County, Iowa